A list of parliamentary opposition leaders in the Canadian province of Saskatchewan, from 1906 to the present.

(1) There was no designated Leader of the Opposition for the sessions of 1921 and 1922.
In the period 1925-1929 C.E. Tran and J.T.M. Anderson were paid equal allowances as
Leaders of the Opposition.

(2)The Saskatchewan CCF officially became the Saskatchewan NDP on November 25, 1967. 

(3)From June 24, 1977 E.C. Malone and R.L. Collver were paid equal allowances as Leader
of the Liberal Opposition and Progressive Conservative Opposition respectively.

(4)Mr. Richard James Swenson was designated Leader of the Opposition on January 1, 1993.

(5)Ms. Lynda Haverstock resigned as Leader of the Opposition on November 12, 1995.
Mr. Ron Osika was designated Leader of the Opposition on November 15, 1995.

(6)Mr. Kenneth Krawetz was designated Leader of the Opposition on December 6, 1996.

(7)Mr. Kenneth Krawetz was designated Leader of the Opposition in August 1997.

See also 

Saskatchewan
Leaders of the Opposition
Saskatchewan